Austria participated in the Eurovision Song Contest 1999 with the song "Reflection" written by Dave Moskin. The Austrian broadcaster ORF returned to the Eurovision Song Contest after a one-year absence following their relegation from 1998 as one of the six countries with the least total average points over the preceding five contests. ORF opted to select the Austrian entry for the 1999 contest in Jerusalem, Israel via a internal selection. "Reflection" performed by Bobbie Singer was selected to represent Austria upon by the jury panel.

Austria competed in the Eurovision Song Contest which took place on 29 May 1999. Performing during the show in position 18, Austria placed tenth out of the 23 participating countries, scoring 65 points.

Background

The Austrian national broadcaster, Österreichischer Rundfunk (ORF), broadcasts the event within Austria and organises the selection process for the nation's entry. ORF confirmed their intentions to participate in Autumn 1998. Along with their participation confirmation, the broadcaster also announced that the Austrian entry for the 1999 contest would be selected through a internal selection.

Before Eurovision

Internal selection
On 12 February 1999, ORF announced that they had internally selected Bobbie Singer to represent Austria in the Eurovision Song Contest 1999 with the song "Reflection", composed by Dave Moskin. The announcement of the selected artist occurred during the event at Ö3-Haus in Vienna. Bobbie Singer's selection as the Austrian representative was decided upon by the jury panel consisting of representatives from the entertainment department of ORF, Ö3 and representatives of record companies from over 200 submissions.

Promotion
To promote "Reflection" as the Austrian Eurovision entry, Bobbie Singer performed at the Merkur City Mall in Vienna on 25 March.

At Eurovision

The Eurovision Song Contest 1999 took place at the International Convention Center in Jerusalem, Israel, on 29 May 1999. According to the Eurovision rules, the 23-country participant list for the contest was composed of: the previous year's winning country and host nation, the seventeen countries which had obtained the highest average points total over the preceding five contests, and any eligible countries which did not compete in the 1998 contest. Austria was one of the eligible countries which did not compete in the 1998 contest, and thus were permitted to participate. The running order for the contest was decided by a draw held on 17 November 1998; Austria was assigned to perform 18th at the 1999 contest, following Ireland's The Mullans with "When You Need Me" and preceding Israel's Eden with "Happy Birthday". Eurovision Song Contest 1999 was televised in Austria on ORF 1 with the commentary by Andi Knoll and on FM4 with the commentary by Stermann & Grissemann. 

The Austrian performance featured Bobbie Singer on stage in red blouse and black jeans performing with two guitarists, drummer and two backing vocalists in a band set-up. After the voting concluded, Austria scored 65 points and placed 10th in a field of 23.

Voting
The same voting system in use since 1975 was again implemented for 1999 contest, with each country providing 1–8, 10 and 12 points to the ten highest-ranking songs as determined by a selected jury or the viewing public through televoting, with countries not allowed to vote for themselves. Austria opted to use televoting to determine which countries would receive their points. The Austrian spokesperson, who announced the points awarded by the Austria during the final, was Dodo Roscic. Below is a breakdown of points awarded to Austria and awarded by Austria in the grand final of the contest.

See also 
Austria in the Eurovision Song Contest
Eurovision Song Contest 1999

References

Bibliography

Further reading
 Jan Feddersen: Ein Lied kann eine Brücke sein. Die deutsche und internationale Geschichte des Grand Prix Eurovision. Hoffmann und Campe, Hamburg 2002, ISBN 3-455-09350-7.

Countries in the Eurovision Song Contest 1999
Austria in the Eurovision Song Contest
Eurovision